The Papua New Guinea Constitutional and Law Reform Commission (CLRC-PNG) is a government commission in Papua New Guinea. Established by parliamentary act in 2004, the Commission is charged with considering reforms to the law of Papua New Guinea.

History
The Law Reform Commission Act of 1975 established a Papua New Guinea Law Reform Commission. From 1975 to 1978 the Commission's chairman was Bernard Narokobi. A separate Constitutional Commission was established by the Constitutional Commission Act of 1993. The 2004 Act united these two bodies. 

In 2009 the Commission established a working committee to review the law on sorcery and related killings.

Eric Kwa became the Commission's chairman in 2011, and held the post until 2018. The current chairman is Kevin Isifu. The Deputy Secretary, and former Acting Secretary, is Dorothy Mimiko-Kesenga.

References

External links
 Official website
 Reports of the Papua New Guinea Constitutional and Law Reform Commission (2007-)
 Reports of the Papua New Guinea Law Reform Commission (1975-1997)

Law of Papua New Guinea
Law commissions
Constitutional commissions
2004 establishments in Papua New Guinea
Government agencies established in 2004